The International Association of Applied Linguistics, or AILA, was formed in 1964 as an association of various national organizations for applied linguistics. AILA has more than 8,000 members in more than 35 different applied linguistics associations around the world. AILA continues to grow, working with existing and emerging regional networks, such as AILA East Asia, AILA Europe, AILA Arabia, and AILA Latin America. Its most high-profile activity is the World Congress of Applied Linguistics, which takes place once every three years. It also has two publications, AILA News, a newsletter, and the AILA Review, an academic journal.

History 
AILA was founded in 1964 at an international colloquium at the University of Nancy, France. Its founding had been preceded by two years of preparation, of which two central figures were the French linguists Antoine Culioli and Guy Capelle. As part of this preparation, the association had published the first issue of its official journal, the International Review of Applied Linguistics, in 1963.

By 1969, the association had gained affiliate organizations in the form of national associations, centers for applied linguistics, and applied linguistics working groups, in a total of 18 different countries. In this year, the association held its second meeting, this time sponsored by the British Association for Applied Linguistics.

Committee
There are eight committees of the association. Each member of the committee is appointed by the current president.

Solidarity Award Committee
Azirah Hashim (chair)
Marjolijn Verspoor (member)
Andrea Sterzuk (member)

The Honorary Award Committee
Susan Hunston (chair)
Sarah O'Brien (member)
Meilutė Ramonienė (member)

Editorial Board of AILA Review
Antje Wilton (chair)
Limin Jin (member)
Rosa Manchón (member)
Branca Falabella Fabricio (member)
Barbara Seidlhofer (member)

Editorial Board of AILA Applied Linguistics Series (AALS)

Antje Wilton (chair)
Hisako Yamauchi (member)
Anne Pitkanen-Huhta (member)
Hanele Dufva (member)
Folkert Kuiken (member)
Susanne Niemeier (member)
Rosa Manchón (member)
Susan Gass (member)

ReN Committee
Laura Gurzynski-Weiss (chair)
Anne Pitkanen-Huhta (member)
Lian Zhang (member)
Laurie Anderson (member)

Nominating Committee
Claire Kramsch (chair)
Ee Ling Low (member)
Markus Bieswanger (member)

The IACC Committee
Daniel Perrin (chair)
Paula Szundy (member)
Marjolijn Verspoor (member)

Objectives 
AILA has three main objectives: to facilitate international cooperation in the field of applied linguistics, to promote research and teaching, and to disseminate new applied linguistics theories.

Presidential history
AILA Presidents are appointed every three years to coincide with the world congress. The position has been held for up to two consecutive three-year periods.

Editorial board

Limin Jin
Barbara Seidlhofer
Rosa Manchón
Branca Falabella Fabricio

Affiliates 
AILA has affiliate associations in the following 34 countries:

Australia: Applied Linguistics Association of Australia (ALAA)
Austria: Verband für angewandte Linguistic (VERBAL)
Belgium: Association Belge de Linguistique Appliquée (ABLA)
Brazil: Applied Linguistics Association of Brazil (ALAB)
Cameroon: AILA Cameroon (CAMAILA)
Canada: Canadian Association of Applied Linguistics (CAAL)
China: China English Language Education Association (CELEA)
Estonia: Estonian Association of Applied Linguistics (EAAL)
Finland: Finnish Association of Applied Linguistics (AFinLA)
France: Association Française de Linguistique Appliquée (AFLA)
Germany: Gesellschaft für Angewandte Linguistik (GAL)
Greece: Greek Applied Linguistics Association (GALA)
Ireland: Irish Association for Applied Linguistics (IRAAL)
Israel: Israel Association of Applied Linguistics (ILASH) 
Italy: Associazione Italiana di Linguistica Applicata (AItLA)
Japan: Japan Association of Applied Linguistics (JAAL)
Korea (South): Applied Linguistics Association of Korea (ALAK)
Malaysia: Malaysian Association of Applied Linguistics (MAAL)
Mexico: Asociación Mexicana de Lingüística Aplicada (AMLA)
Netherlands: Association Nederlandaise de Linguistique Applique (ANELA)
New Zealand: Applied Linguistics Association of New Zealand (ALANZ)
Norway: Association Norvegienne de Linguistique Appliquèe (ANLA)
Philippines: Linguistic Society of the Philippines (LSP)
Russian Federation: National Association for Applied Linguistics (NAAL)
Serbia and Montenegro: Association for Applied Linguistics in Bosnia and Herzegovina (AALBiH)
Singapore: Singapore Association for Applied Linguistics (SAAL) 
Slovenia: Slovene Association for Applied Linguistics (SALA)
South Africa: Southern African Applied Linguistics Association (SAALA)
Spain: Asociaciõn Española de Linguistica Aplicada (AEsLA)
Sweden: Association Suèdoise de Linguistique Appliquèe (ASLA)
Switzerland: Association Suisse de Linguistique Appliquèe (VALS/ASLA)
United Kingdom: British Association of Applied Linguistics (BAAL)
United States: American Association for Applied Linguistics (AAAL)

Activities 
World Congress of Applied Linguistics
AILA’s most high-profile activity is the World Congress of Applied Linguistics, an international conference hosted by one of the affiliate national associations every three years. The one exception to the three-year pattern was the first World Congress in Nancy, France, as there was a five-year gap between that and the second World Congress in Cambridge, England.

The list of world congresses is as follows:
Groningen, Netherlands (2020)
Rio de Janeiro, Brazil (2017)
Brisbane, Australia (2014)
Beijing, China (2011)
Essen, Germany (2008)
Madison, Wisconsin, United States (2005)
Singapore (2002)
Tokyo, Japan (1999)
Jyväskylä, Finland (1996)
Amsterdam, Netherlands (1993)
Chalkidiki, Greece (1990)
Sydney, Australia (1987)
Brussels, Belgium (1984)
Lund, Sweden (1981)
Montreal, Canada (1978)
Stuttgart, Germany (1975)
Copenhagen, Denmark (1972)
Cambridge, England (1969)
Nancy, France (1964)

Publications 
AILA has two main publications, AILA News and the AILA Review. AILA News is a newsletter, published three times a year, and the AILA Review is a journal, published once a year and edited by guest editors. Each edition of the AILA Review either contains collections of papers on a particular topic, or a collection of papers from one of the World Congresses. In addition to these two publications, AILA also works with the British Association for Applied Linguistics, the American Association for Applied Linguistics, and Oxford University Press to publish the journal Applied Linguistics.

Governance 
Decisions in the association are made by the executive board and the international committee. The executive board makes recommendations to the international committee, on which all the national affiliated associations of applied linguistics can vote. These votes take place once a year, at different sites around the world.

The executive board has eleven posts, seven of which are fixed roles. These are the president, a past president, the treasurer, the secretary general, the research networks coordinator and the publications coordinator. The remaining four posts do not have a fixed role, and their holders are known as members at large. Members of the board cover their own expenses.

References

External links 
 

Applied linguistics
Linguistic societies